Pursat is the capital of Pursat Province, Cambodia. Its name derived from a type of tree. It lies on the Pursat River. The city is famous as the place of mythical 16th century neak ta of Khleang Moeung.

Notes 

 

Provincial capitals in Cambodia
Cities in Cambodia
Populated places in Pursat province